The Dutch Rhenish Railway or Dutch–Rhenish Railway ( or ) was a Dutch railway company active from 1845 until 1890.

History

The Dutch Rhenish Railway Company Limited was founded in Amsterdam on 3 July 1845 to take over the state-run Rhenish Railway, which was losing money. The majority of the shareholders were British. In or shortly after 1857, James Staats Forbes was appointed general manager for five years. He remained a permanent adviser to the company until its concession expired and it was nationalised in 1890. The Dutch businessman and politician Hendrik Adriaan van Beuningen started his career at DRR as a clerk, but was soon promoted to freight transport manager.

Locomotive number 107, Sharp Stewart 3563/1889, is preserved in the Utrecht Railway Museum.

Lines
Lines built and operated by the Dutch Rhenish Railway include:
 The Utrecht – Rotterdam line, opened in 1855
 The extension of the Rhenish Railway to Germany, opened in 1856
 The Zevenaar – Cleves line, opened in 1865
 The Harmelen – Breukelen line, opened in 1869
 The Gouda – The Hague line, opened in 1870.

References

Railway companies established in 1845
Railway companies disestablished in 1890
Railway companies of the Netherlands
Companies based in Amsterdam
Former Dutch railway company
Nederlandsche Rhijnspoorweg-Maatschappij